Thomas Linnemann Laub (5 December 1852 – 4 February 1927) was a Danish organist and composer.

Notable works
1888 80 rytmiske Koraler, en enstemmig samling
1889–1891 Kirkemelodier, tre hæfter med firstemmige udsættelser
1890 10 gamle danske Folkeviser udsatte for blandet kor
1896 Udvalg af Salmemelodier i Kirkestil
1899 Danske Folkeviser med gamle Melodier I med Axel Olrik,
1902 Udvalg af Salmemelodier i Kirkestil, bind 2.
1904 Danske Folkeviser med gamle Melodier II med Axel Olrik
1909 Forspil og Melodier. Forsøg i Kirkestil
1915 En Snes danske Viser med Carl Nielsen
1917 En Snes danske Viser, hæfte 2 (igen med Carl Nielsen)
1918 koralbogen Dansk Kirkesang
1920 Tolv viser og sange af danske digtere
1920 Ti Aarestrupske ritorneller
1922 30 danske sange for 3 og 4 lige stemmer
1922 Udkom Folkehøjskolens Melodibog med en række folkelige melodier af Th. Laub
1928 24 salmer og 12 folkeviser udsat for 2 og 3 lige stemmer

See also
List of Danish composers

References
This article was initially translated from the Danish Wikipedia.

External links
 
 

Danish classical organists
Male classical organists
Danish composers
Male composers
1852 births
1927 deaths